René Charrière (30 July 1923 – 21 March 1999) was a Swiss racewalker. He competed in the men's 50 kilometres walk at the 1952 Summer Olympics and the 1960 Summer Olympics.

References

1923 births
1999 deaths
Athletes (track and field) at the 1952 Summer Olympics
Athletes (track and field) at the 1960 Summer Olympics
Swiss male racewalkers
Olympic athletes of Switzerland
Place of birth missing